Hyūga may refer to:

 Hyūga, Miyazaki, a city in Japan
 Hyūga Province, an old province of Japan
 Japanese battleship Hyūga, a battleship of the Imperial Japanese Navy
 Hyūga class helicopter destroyer, a helicopter carrier of the Japanese Maritime Self Defense Force
 JDS Hyūga (DDH-181), the lead ship of the class
 Hyūga Station, a train station in Chiba Prefecture, Japan

People with the given name
, Japanese motorcycle racer

Fictional characters
 Makoto Hyuga from Neon Genesis Evangelion franchise
 Saki Hyuuga, protagonist of Futari wa Pretty Cure Splash Star
 Yuri Hyuga, a character in the Shadow Hearts Universe
 Hyūga Kojirō from the anime/manga Captain Tsubasa
 Major Hyuuga, a character in the anime 07-Ghost
 Hyuuga/Bull Black, a character from Seijuu Sentai Gingaman
 Junpei Hyuuga, a character in the anime Kuroko's Basketball
 Mayuki Hyuuga, the protagonist in the manga and anime series Fantastic Detective Labyrinth
 Hyūga clan members in the popular manga Naruto

Japanese masculine given names
Japanese-language surnames